The Tatungalung are an indigenous Australian people of the state of Victoria. They are often, together with the Bratauolung, Braiakaulung, Brabiralung and Krauatungalung classified as belonging to one nation, the Gunai/Kurnai, though this typology has been thought, by Norman Tindale, to be an artificial construct.

Name
The word tatung means 'south', referring to the fact that they are the southernmost of the Gunai peoples.

Language
The Tatungalung traditionally spoke a dialect that was likely mutually intelligible with the Brataualung and the Braiakaulung, and collectively called Nulit. Robert M. W. Dixon considers Nulit itself to be a dialect of Muk-thang.

Country
Their traditional lands covered an estimated , running along the coast of Ninety Mile Beach and about Lakes Victoria and Wellington, including a group established on Raymond Island, at King Lake. Their frontiers were at Lakes Entrance to the mouth of Merriman Creek in the west.

Social organization
According to Friedrich Hagenauer the Tatungalung were divided into 4 hordes, though Alfred William Howitt adds a fifth. Tindale suspected that one of the names associated with the tribe, Boul-boul, might refer to one of these hordes.

The clan or horde that lived on Raymond Island, which Howitt says was an enclave - the mainland around the shores of King Lake being Brabiralung ground - was known as the Biinjil-baur, and they asserted a right to exclusive ownership of all of the swans' eggs laid on the site. This notice has drawn the attention of scholars because the concept of property, widely thought absent, appears here to have been asserted as an exclusive title.

History
A tradition relates that, in revenge for killing one of their men, the Brabiralung set up an ambush, using a hill overlooking the island to secretly make preparations.

Alternative names
 Boul-boul
 Nulit (this name was also used of the Bratauolung, and refers to the dialect or language the two tribes spoke
 Tatoongolong
 Tatung
 Tatunga
 Tirtalawakani
 Tirthung

Source:

Notes

Citations

Sources

Aboriginal peoples of Victoria (Australia)
History of Victoria (Australia)